"The Truth About Men" is a song written by Paul Overstreet, Rory Feek and Tim Johnson, and recorded by American country music singer Tracy Byrd.  It was released in March 2003 as the first single and title track from his album The Truth About Men.  The song peaked at number 13 on the Hot Country Songs charts.

Content
The song is in the key of C major with a "shuffle" beat and approximately 144 beats per minute. Its vocals range from G-E. In it, the narrator states "the truth about men" in various situations.

Blake Shelton, Andy Griggs, and Montgomery Gentry sing guest vocals on the second verse.

Critical reception
Ray Waddell of Billboard magazine described the song as "hilarious" in his review of the album. Reviewing the album for Allmusic, Stephen Thomas Erlewine called the song "a little too silly" and said that "some of the jibes don't quite work".

Music video
The music video was directed by Thom Oliphant and premiered in early 2003.

Chart performance
"The Truth About Men" debuted on the Hot Country Songs charts for the week ending March 15, 2003. It spent 21 weeks on the charts and peaked at number 13. It also peaked at number 77 on the Billboard Hot 100. Before its release, Byrd charted at number 38 on Hot Country Songs with a cut titled "Lately (Been Dreamin' 'bout Babies)", which did not appear on any of his albums.

Year-end charts

References

2003 songs
2003 singles
Tracy Byrd songs
Blake Shelton songs
Andy Griggs songs
Montgomery Gentry songs
Vocal collaborations
Songs written by Rory Feek
Songs written by Tim Johnson (songwriter)
Songs written by Paul Overstreet
Song recordings produced by Billy Joe Walker Jr.
RCA Records Nashville singles